In Greek mythology, the name Leucadius  may refer to:

Leucadius, a son of Icarius and Polycaste, co-ruler of Acarnania with his brother Alyzeus, and the eponym of Leucas.
Leucadius, a surname of Apollo.

Notes

References 

 Sextus Propertius, Elegies from Charm. Vincent Katz. trans. Los Angeles. Sun & Moon Press. 1995. Online version at the Perseus Digital Library. Latin text available at the same website.
 Strabo, The Geography of Strabo. Edition by H.L. Jones. Cambridge, Mass.: Harvard University Press; London: William Heinemann, Ltd. 1924. Online version at the Perseus Digital Library.
 Strabo, Geographica edited by A. Meineke. Leipzig: Teubner. 1877. Greek text available at the Perseus Digital Library.
 Publius Ovidius Naso, Tristia (The Early Letters from Tomis AD 8-12) translated by A. S. Kline. © Copyright 2003. Online version at the Topos Text Project.
 Publius Ovidius Naso, Tristia. Arthur Leslie Wheeler. Cambridge, MA. Harvard University Press. 1939. Latin text available at the Perseus Digital Library.

Kings in Greek mythology
Epithets of Apollo